Linda Featherston is an American politician and music teacher serving as a member of the Kansas House of Representatives from the 16th district. Elected in November 2020, she assumed office on January 11, 2021.

Early life and education 
Featherston was born and raised in Topeka, Kansas. She earned a Bachelor of Music Education and Master of Music from Kansas State University.

Career 
Featherston has worked as a piano teacher. She became involved in politics while working as a campaign volunteer for her predecessor, Cindy Holscher. She was elected to the Kansas House of Representatives in November 2020 and she assumed office on January 11, 2021.

References 

Living people
People from Topeka, Kansas
Politicians from Topeka, Kansas
People from Johnson County, Kansas
Kansas State University alumni
Democratic Party members of the Kansas House of Representatives
Women state legislators in Kansas
Year of birth missing (living people)
21st-century American women